Foresthall House (or Fforestfach House) was a mansion-like house that existeded in the Swansea suburb of Fforestfach until the 1970s, when the old and crumbling mansion was bought by Swansea Council and demolished in order to make way for various new estates.

The mansion was located on the western side of Ravenhill, and had a garden stretching from the mansion itself to the far back end of Cadle Woods. The mansion can be dated from the many Ordnance Survey maps from 1861 to 1868 that show it. The owner of the mansion planted many trees around his land, most notably the Horse Chestnut Tree, which can still be seen today. The owner of the house is blamed for the Japanese knotweed problem in the Swansea area, as in 19th-century Japanese knotweed was used commonly as a potted plant for ornamental use, and was also used on his land to prevent soil erosion.

Buildings and structures in Swansea
History of Swansea